Ingrid Wendt (born 1944), is an American writer and poet.

Personal life 
Married to Ralph Salisbury, she lives in Eugene, Oregon.

Education 
Wendt graduated from Cornell College in Iowa in 1966, and that year she moved to Oregon.

Awards 
She has won both the Yellowglen Award and an Oregon Book Award.

Works

References

1944 births
Cornell College alumni
Living people
Place of birth missing (living people)
Poets from Oregon
Writers from Eugene, Oregon